In Your House 5 (retroactively titled In Your House 5: Seasons Beatings) was the fifth In Your House professional wrestling pay-per-view (PPV) event produced by the World Wrestling Federation (WWF, now WWE). The event took place on December 17, 1995, at the Hersheypark Arena in Hershey, Pennsylvania. Six matches aired as part of the PPV broadcast and three additional matches were held as dark matches. With the launch of the WWE Network in 2014, this show became available on demand, but does not include the three dark matches held before and after the main show. 

The main event was a rematch from the 1992 SummerSlam show as WWF World Heavyweight Champion Bret Hart defended the championship against his brother-in-law The British Bulldog. On the undercard the Undertaker faced off against King Mabel in a Casket match. Another match on the show could only end when either Hunter Hearst Helmsley or Henry O. Godwinn was thrown into a hog pen that was erected in the arena.

Production

Background
In Your House was a series of monthly pay-per-view (PPV) shows first produced by the World Wrestling Federation (WWF, now WWE) in May 1995. They aired when the promotion was not holding one of its then-five major PPVs (WrestleMania, King of the Ring, SummerSlam, Survivor Series, and Royal Rumble), and were sold at a lower cost. This fifth In Your House event took place on December 17, 1995, at the Hersheypark Arena in Hershey, Pennsylvania. While this event was originally known simply as In Your House 5, it was later retroactively renamed as In Your House 5: Seasons Beatings. This retroactive renaming of the show was based on the event's holiday scheduling.

Storylines
In Your House 5 featured professional wrestling matches involving different wrestlers from pre-existing scripted feuds, plots, and storylines that were played out on Monday Night Raw and other World Wrestling Federation (WWF) television programs. Wrestlers portrayed a villain or a hero as they followed a series of events that built tension, and culminated into a wrestling match or series of matches.

Event
Following the first match on the broadcast, Jerry Lawler introduced the returning Jeff Jarrett and presented him with a storyline gold record for supposedly selling 500,000 copies of his country music album, Ain't I Great. Lawler then invited Jarrett to do commentary with himself and Vince McMahon for the next match. In the second match Ahmed Johnson was originally supposed to face Dean Douglas, but Douglas claimed that he could not compete due to a back injury. He introduced Buddy Landel (his "graduate student") as his replacement for the night. Johnson won the match, and afterward Jarrett attacked Johnson with his gold record.

Another non-match segment saw Savio Vega handing out presents to children with Santa Claus, when Ted DiBiase came out and ordered Santa to attack Vega. He revealed that "Santa" was actually Xanta Klaus, Santa's evil brother who lives in the South Pole and steals presents. Xanta was portrayed by SMW wrestler, Jon Rechner, later better known as Balls Mahoney. The Xanta gimmick appeared very little after this.

Results

Other on-screen personnel

References

05: Seasons Beatings
Professional wrestling in Pennsylvania
1995 in Pennsylvania
Events in Pennsylvania
1995 WWF pay-per-view events
December 1995 events in the United States